The Rivière du Milieu is a tributary of Lac de la Belle Rivière, flowing the unorganized territory of Belle-Rivière, in the Lac-Saint-Jean-Est Regional County Municipality, in the administrative region of Saguenay-Lac-Saint-Jean, in the province of Quebec, in Canada. The course of this river is located in the northwestern part of the Laurentides Wildlife Reserve.

The middle river valley is located between route 155 (connecting La Tuque to Chambord) and route 169 (connecting Quebec (city) to Alma). This valley is served by some secondary forest roads, especially for forestry and recreational tourism activities.

Forestry is the main economic activity in this valley; recreational tourism, second.

The surface of the Middle River is usually frozen from the beginning of December to the end of March, however the safe circulation on the ice is generally made from mid-December to mid-March.

Geography 
The main watersheds neighboring the Rivière du Milieu are:
 north side: lac de la Belle Rivière, La Belle Rivière, Vert Lake, Bédard River (Saguenay River), Petite rivière Bédard, Rouge Creek, La Petite Décharge, Saguenay River;
 east side: Rivière aux Écorces, Pikauba River;
 south side: Grand lac des Cèdres, Métabetchouane River, outlet of Grand lac des Cèdres, Rivière aux Canots, Rivière aux Écorces;
 west side: Lac à la Carpe, Métabetchouane River, Bouchette lake, Ouiatchouan River, Lac Saint-Jean.

The Rivière du Milieu takes its source from non-Morelle lake in the forest zone in the Laurentides Wildlife Reserve. This source is located at:
  west of the Rivière aux Écorces;
  south-east of route 169;
  west of the center of the hamlet of Mont-Apica;
  south of the confluence of the Rivière du Milieu and Lac de la Belle Rivière;
  south-east of the mouth of Belle Rivière lake;
  south-east of lac Saint-Jean.

  northwards passing east of lac Dabin and collecting the outlet (coming from the south) from lac Marsanne, up to the outlet of lac Barré (coming from the west);
  northward, curving northwest, to the outlet (coming from the north) of Lac des Vermisseaux;
  north-west, up to the outlet of some lakes including Serpentin Lake, Binet Lake, Anthemides Lake;
  north-west, up to the outlet (coming from the south-west) of lakes Loriset and Cognée;
  north to its mouth.

The Middle River pours into the bottom of a bay on the east shore of Lac Saint-Jean. This confluence is located at:
  south-east of the mouth of lac de la Belle Rivière;
  south of Vert Lake;
  south-east of the confluence of La Belle Rivière with a bay on the east shore of Lac Saint-Jean;
  south-east of the mouth of Lac Saint-Jean (via La Petite Décharge;
  south of downtown Alma;
  southwest of downtown Chicoutimi (sector of Saguenay (city)).

Toponymy 
The toponym "Rivière du Milieu" was formalized on December 5, 1968, at the Place Names Bank of the Commission de toponymie du Québec.

Notes and references

Appendices

Related articles 
 Lac-Saint-Jean-Est Regional County Municipality
 Belle-Rivière, a TNO
 Laurentides Wildlife Reserve
 Lac de la Belle Rivière, a body of water
 La Belle Rivière, a stream
 Lac Saint-Jean, a body of water
 Saguenay River, a stream
 List of rivers of Quebec

Rivers of Saguenay–Lac-Saint-Jean
Regional county municipalities in Saguenay–Lac-Saint-Jean
Laurentides Wildlife Reserve